Inner Harbor or Inner Harbour may refer to:

Antarctica 
 Inner Harbor (Antarctica)

Australia 
 Inner Harbour ferry services, Sydney, New South Wales
 Inner Harbour, Fremantle Harbour, Western Australia
 Inner Harbour, Port River, Port Adelaide, South Australia

Canada 
 Inner Harbour of Victoria Harbour, British Columbia
 Inner Harbour of Toronto Harbour
 Inner Harbour, Kingston, Ontario

China 
 Haikou New Port, Hainan, formerly called Inner Harbour

Germany 
 Duisburg Inner Harbour

United States 
 Inner Harbor Navigation Canal, New Orleans, Louisiana
 Inner Harbor, Baltimore, Maryland
 Inner Harbor East, Baltimore, Maryland
 Boston Inner Harbor, Boston Harbor, Massachusetts
 Inner Harbor, Syracuse, New York